Global climate change has resulted in a wide range of impacts on the spread of infectious diseases. Like other climate change impacts on human health, climate change exacerbates existing inequalities and challenges in managing infectious disease. It also increases the likelihood of certain kinds of new infectious disease challenges. Infectious diseases whose transmission can be impacted by climate change include Dengue fever, malaria, tick-borne diseases, leishmaniasis and Ebola virus disease. One Health, a model that considers veterinary and human health parts of an integrated whole, is partly a response to the increase of epidemic risks that arise from climate change. There is no direct evidence that the spread of COVID-19 is worsened or is caused by climate change, although investigations continue. 

Documented infectious disease impacts of climate change include increased malaria and dengue, which are expected to worsen as climate change results in extreme weather conditions and higher temperatures. Aside from contributing to their spread, climate change will probably cause the emergence of new infectious diseases and change the epidemiology of many existing diseases. Climate change increases pandemic risks.

Background 
The World Health Organization and United Nations Environment Programme established the Intergovernmental Panel on Climate Change (IPCC) in 1988 because little was known about health issues caused by global climate change. Intergovernmental Panel on Climate Change has presented three assessment reports. IPCC First Assessment Report, IPCC Second Assessment Report and IPCC Third Assessment Report wrote about climate change, potential health risks caused by climate change and early evidence of actual health impacts. IPPC and other policy-related assessments at the regional and national levels stimulated scientific studies to understand the climate-health relationships.

A noticeable effect of global climate change is the increase of temperature. Since the beginning of record-keeping of temperature in the U.S. in 1895, the average temperature has increased by 1.3 °F to 1.9 °F. This is because the concentrations of greenhouse gases increase. Extreme temperatures affect the body by compromising its ability to regulate its internal temperature and by worsening chronic conditions such as cardiovascular and respiratory diseases. This is expected to worsen respiratory conditions. Climate change affects the growing season and the pollen because the start or duration of the growing season becomes extended, and the quantity, the allergenicity and the spatial distribution of pollen increase. Climate change affects vector-borne diseases by affecting the survival, distribution and behavior of vectors such as mosquitoes, ticks and rodents. The viruses, bacteria and protozoa are carried by these vectors transferring it from carrier to another. Vector and pathogen can adapt to the climate fluctuations by shifting and expanding their geographic ranges, which can alter the rate of new cases of disease depending on vector-host interaction, host immunity and pathogen evolution. This means that climate change affects infectious diseases by impacting their length of the transmission season and their geographical range. Vector-borne diseases are a concern because they have played a significant role in human history by determining the rise and fall of civilizations. This is why the World Health Organization considers climate change as one of the greatest threats to human health. Diseases that are products of climate change fall under the scope of environmental health professionals, who study how to control environmental factors that affect human health.

In 2022, a big study dedicated to the link between climate change and Zoonosis was published. The study found a strong link between climate change and the epidemics emergence in the last 15 years as it causes a massive migration of species to new areas, consequently, contacts between different species who had not met each other before. Even in the scenario with weak climatic changes, there will be 15,000 spillovers of viruses to new hosts in the next decades. The areas with the most possibilities to spillover are the mountainous tropical regions of Africa and Southeast Asia. Southeast Asia is more vulnerable as it has a large number of bat species that generally do not mix but can do it easily by flying if climate change forces them to migrate.

Another study concluded in 2022 that "58% (that is, 218 out of 375) of infectious diseases confronted by humanity worldwide have been at some point aggravated by climatic hazards".

Malaria

Increased precipitation like rain could increase the number of mosquitos indirectly by expanding larval habitat and food supply. Malaria, which kills approximately 300,000 children (under age 5) annually, poses an imminent threat through temperature increase. Models suggest, conservatively, that risk of malaria will increase 5–15% by 2100 due to climate change. In Africa alone, according to the MARA Project (Mapping Malaria Risk in Africa), there is a projected increase of 16–28% in person-month exposures to malaria by 2100.

Climate is an influential driving force of vector-borne diseases such as malaria. Malaria is especially susceptible to the effects of climate change because mosquitoes lack the mechanisms to regulate their internal temperature. This implies that there is a limited range of climatic conditions within which the pathogen (malaria) and vector (a mosquito) can survive, reproduce, and infect hosts. Vector-borne diseases, such as malaria, have distinctive characteristics that determine pathogenicity. These include the survival and reproduction rate of the vector, the level of vector activity (i.e., the biting or feeding rate), and the development and reproduction rate of the pathogen within the vector or host. Changes in climate factors substantially affect reproduction, development, distribution, and seasonal transmissions of malaria.

Malaria is a mosquito-borne parasitic disease that infects humans and other animals caused by microorganisms in the Plasmodium family. It begins with a bite from an infected female mosquito, which introduces the parasite through its saliva and into the infected host's circulatory system. It then travels through the bloodstream into the liver where it can mature and reproduce. The disease causes symptoms that typically include fever, headache, shaking chills, anemia, and in severe cases can progress to coma or death. "About 3.2 billion people – nearly half of the world's population – are at risk of malaria. In 2015, there were roughly 214 million malaria cases and an estimated 438,000 malaria deaths."

Mosquitoes have a small window for preferential conditions for breeding and maturation. The ultimate breeding and maturing temperature for mosquitoes ranges from 16 to 18 degrees Celsius. If the temperature is decreased by 2 degrees, most of the insects will succumb to death. This is why malaria is unsustainable in places with cool winters. When a climate with an average of approximately 16 degrees Celsius experiences an increase of about two degrees, the mature bugs, and the larvae flourish. Anopheles mosquitoes will need more food (human/animal blood) to sustain life and to stimulate production of eggs. This increases the chance of spreading malaria due to more human contact and a higher number of the blood sucking insects surviving and living longer. Mosquitoes are also highly sensitive to changes in precipitation and humidity. Increased precipitation can increase mosquito population indirectly by expanding larval habitat and food supply. These prime temperatures are creating large breeding grounds for the insects and places for the larvae to mature. Increased temperature is causing snow to melt and stagnant pools of water to become more common. Bugs that are already carrying the disease are more likely to multiply and infect other mosquitoes causing a dangerous spread of the deadly disease.

Climate change has a direct impact on people's health in places where malaria was originally not prevalent. Mosquitoes are sensitive to temperature changes and the warming of their environment will boost their rates of production. A fluctuation of two or three degrees is creating exceptional breeding grounds for mosquitoes, for larvae to grow and mature mosquitoes carrying the virus to infect people that have never been exposed before. In communities living in the higher altitudes in Africa and South America, people are at a higher risk for developing malaria because of the increase in the average temperature of the surroundings. This is a severe problem because people in these communities have never been exposed to this disease, causing an increased risk for complications from malaria such as cerebral malaria (a type of malaria that causes mental disability, paralysis and has a high mortality rate) and death by the disease. Residents of these communities are being hit hard by malaria because they are unfamiliar with it; they do not know the signs and symptoms and have little to no immunity.

The population at risk of malaria in the absence of climate change is projected to double between 1990 and 2080 to 8820 million, however; unmitigated climate change would, by the 2080s, further increase the population at risk of malaria by another 257 to 323 million. Therefore, reducing the effects of climate change in the present would reduce the total by about 3.5%, saving tens of thousands of lives worldwide.

African Highlands

Exposures 
"The Epidemiologic Triad" is a model that explains the relationship between exposure, transmission, and causation of infectious diseases and it illustrates the shifting malaria transmission rates. With regards to malaria transmission rates in the African Highlands, factors and exposures resulting from drastic environmental changes like warmer climates, shifts in weather patterns, and increases in human impact such as deforestation, provide appropriate conditions for malaria transmission between carrier and host. Because of this, vectors will adapt, thrive, and multiply at a fast pace. An increase in the number of vectors that carry parasites, microbes, and pathogens that cause disease will become a health hazard for the human population. Specifically, malaria is caused by the Plasmodium falciparum and Plasmodium vivax parasites which are carried by the vector Anopheles mosquito. Even though the Plasmodium vivax parasite can survive in lower temperatures, the Plasmodium falciparum parasite will only survive and replicate in the mosquito when climate temperatures are above 20℃. Increases in humidity and rain also contribute to the replication and survival of this infectious agent., Increasing global temperatures combined with changes in land cover because of extreme deforestation will create ideal habitats for mosquitoes to survive in the African Highlands. If deforestation continues at its current rate, more land will be available for mosquito breeding grounds, and the population of mosquitos will rapidly increase. The increase in mosquitoes will thus increase the opportunity for both Plasmodium falciparum and Plasmodium vivax parasites to proliferate.

Exposure to malaria will become a greater risk to humans as the number of female Anopheles mosquitos infected with either the Plasmodium falciparum or Plasmodium vivax parasite increases. The mosquito will transmit the parasite to the human host through a bite, resulting in infection. Then, when an uninfected mosquito bites the infected human host, the parasite will be transmitted to the mosquitoes which will then become exposure to other uninfected human hosts. Individuals who are constantly exposed to the Malaria parasite due to multiple bites by mosquitoes that carry the parasite are at greater risk of dying. Infected humans can also transmit the disease to uninfected or healthy humans via contaminated blood.

Health Effects 
The health effects caused by shifts in malaria transmission rates in the African Highlands have the potential to be severe. The effects of climate change on health will impact most populations over the next few decades. However, Africa, and specifically, the African Highlands, are susceptible to being particularly negatively affected. In 2010, 91% of the global burden due to malaria deaths occurred in Africa. Several spatiotemporal models have been studied to assess the potential effect of projected climate scenarios on malaria transmission in Africa. It is expected that the most significant climate change effects are confined to specific regions, including the African Highlands.

Studies show an overall increase in climate suitability for malaria transmission resulting in an increase in the population at risk of contracting the disease. Of significant importance is the increase of epidemic potential at higher altitudes (like the African Highlands). Rising temperatures in these areas have the potential to change normally non-malarial areas to areas with seasonal epidemics. Consequently, new populations will be exposed to the disease resulting in healthy years lost. In addition, the disease burden may be more detrimental to areas that lack the ability and resources to effectively respond to such challenges and stresses.

Prevention 

The challenges of controlling and possibly eradicating malaria in the African Highlands are many and varied. Many of the strategies used to control malaria have not changed, are few in number and have rarely been added to in the last 20 years.

The most common forms of control are educating the public and vector control. The huge geographic area of the vectors Anopheles is possibly the largest challenge faced in the control of malaria. With such a large area to cover it is hard to use insecticides at a continuous and effective level. This form of control is expensive, and the areas affected are not able to sustain control. Without sustained control, a rapid resurgence in parasite transmission is seen. Another challenge with insecticides is that the vector is becoming insecticide resistant. Mosquitoes have several generations per year so resistance is seen very quickly.

Education has its limitations as well, as the population most affected by malaria are children, and the educational message is to stay inside during peak mosquito activity. The low socioeconomic status of the people who inhabit the African Highlands is also a challenge. Local health facilities have limited resources, and poor living conditions and malnourishment exacerbate malaria symptoms and increase the likelihood of death due to malaria. As climate change shifts geographic areas of transmission to the African Highlands, the challenge will be to find and control the vector in areas that have not seen it before, and to not waste resources on areas where the temperature is no longer conducive to parasite growth.

A number of groups are working on a vaccine--some are looking to control the transmission of the parasite to the host, or control transmission from human back to the vector. These vaccines are not very effective, and lose their effectiveness over time, so are not ideal. But the development is still progressing in the hopes of finding a better, more effective long-lasting vaccine. An alternative to vaccines is vectored immunoprophylaxis (VIP) that is a form a gene therapy. This therapy will change cells in the host that will secrete antigens from various stages of the parasite in the hopes of triggering an anamnestic immune response in the recipient, prevent disease and parasite transmission.

Policy Implications 
The policy implications of climate change and malaria rates in the African Highlands fall into two categories:

 Enacting policy that will reduce greenhouse gas emissions, thus slowing down climate change, and
 Mitigating problems that have already arisen, and will inevitably continue to develop, due to climate change.

Addressing both of these areas is of importance, as those in the poorest countries, including countries that make up the African Highlands, face the greatest burden. Additionally, when countries are forced to contend with a disease like malaria, their prospects for economic growth are slowed. This contributes to continued and worsening global inequality.

When one focuses on mitigation, specifically as it relates to malaria in the African Highlands, research is still an important component. This research needs to take many forms, including attribution studies, to find the degree to which climate change effects malaria rates; scenario modeling, which can help further our understanding of future climate change consequences on malaria rates; and examinations of intervention programs and techniques, to help our understanding of what appropriate responses are. Surveillance and monitoring of malaria in populations in the African Highlands will also be important, to better understand disease.

Policies are required that will significantly increase investments in public health in the African Highlands. This achieves two goals, the first being better outcomes related to malaria in the affected area, and the second being an overall better health environment for populations. It is also important to focus on "one-health approaches." This means collaborating on an interdisciplinary level, across various geographic areas, to come up with workable solutions.

Non-climatic determinants 
Sociodemographic factors include, but are not limited to: patterns of human migration and travel, effectiveness of public health and medical infrastructure in controlling and treating disease, the extent of anti-malarial drug resistance and the underlying health status of the population at hand. Environmental factors include: changes in land-use (e.g. deforestation), expansion of agricultural and water development projects (which tend to increase mosquito breeding habitat), and the overall trend towards urbanization (i.e. increased concentration of human hosts). These changes in landscape can alter local weather more than long term climate change. For example, the deforestation and cultivation of natural swamps in the African highlands has created conditions favorable for the survival of mosquito larvae, and has, in part, led to the increasing incidence of malaria. The effects of these non-climatic factors complicate things and make a direct causal relationship between climate change and malaria difficult to confirm. It is highly unlikely that climate exerts an isolated effect.

Dengue fever 
Dengue fever is an infectious disease caused by dengue viruses known to be in the tropical regions. It is transmitted by the mosquito Aedes, or A. aegypti. Dengue incidence has increased in the last few decades and is projected to continue to do so with changing climate conditions. Once infected with the dengue virus, humans experience severe flu-like symptoms. Also known as "break-bone fever", dengue can affect infants, children, and adults and can be fatal. Dengue fever is spread by the bite of the female mosquito known as Aedes aegypti. The female mosquito is a highly effective vector of this disease. Climate change has created conditions favorable to the spread of the dengue virus. Transmission peaks during the rainy season when mosquitoes breed.

The World Health Organization (WHO) has reported an increase from a thousand to one million confirmed cases between 1955 and 2007. The presence and number of Aedes aegypti mosquitoes is strongly influenced by the amount of water-bearing containers or pockets of stagnant water in an area, daily temperature and variation in temperature, moisture, and solar radiation. While dengue fever is primarily considered a tropical and subtropical disease, the geographic ranges of the Aedes aegypti are expanding. The recent spread of this primary vector of dengue is attributed to globalization, trade, travel, demographic trends, and warming temperatures.

Dengue is ranked as the most important vector-borne viral disease in the world. An estimated 50–100 million dengue fever infections occur annually. In just the past 50 years, transmission has increased drastically with new cases of the disease (incidence) increasing 30-fold. Once localized to a few areas in the tropics, dengue fever is endemic in over 100 countries in Southeast Asia, the Americas, Africa, the Eastern Mediterranean, and the Western Pacific with Southeast Asia and the Western Pacific regions being the most seriously affected. The number of reported cases has continually increased along with dengue spreading to new areas. Explosive outbreaks are also occurring. Moreover, a possible threat of outbreak exists in Europe with local transmission of dengue being reported for the first time in France and Croatia in 2010.
One country that has seen significant impacts from dengue is Bangladesh.

The cases of dengue fever have increased dramatically since the 1970s and it continues to become more prevalent. The greater incidence of this disease is believed to be due to a combination of urbanization, population growth, increased international travel, and climate change. The same trends also led to the spread of different serotypes of the disease to new areas, and to the emergence of dengue hemorrhagic fever. Four viruses can cause dengue fever exist. If someone is infected with one type of dengue virus, he or she will have permanent immunity to that type of dengue virus but will have short term immunity to the other type of dengue fever. Some of the symptoms of dengue fever are fever, headache, muscle and joint pains and skin rash.

Dengue fever used to be considered a tropical disease, but climate change is causing dengue fever to spread. Dengue fever is transmitted by certain types of mosquitoes, which have been spreading further and further north. This is because some of the climate changes that are occurring are increased heat, precipitation and humidity which create prime breeding grounds for mosquitoes. The hotter and wetter a climate is, the faster the mosquitoes can mature and the faster the disease can develop. Another influence is the changing El Nino effects that are affecting the climate to change in different areas of the world, causing dengue fever to be able to spread.

"Some 1.8 billion (more than 70%) of the population at risk for dengue worldwide live in member states of the WHO South-East Asia Region and Western Pacific Region, which bear nearly 75% of the current global disease burden due to dengue. The Asia Pacific Dengue Strategic Plan for both regions (2008—2015) has been prepared in consultation with member countries and development partners in response to the increasing threat from dengue, which is spreading to new geographical areas and causing high mortality during the early phase of outbreaks. The strategic plan aims to aid countries to reverse the rising trend of dengue by enhancing their preparedness to detect, characterize and contain outbreaks rapidly and to stop the spread to new areas."

Tick borne disease 
Tick-borne disease, which affect humans and other animals, are caused by infectious agents transmitted by tick bites. A high humidity of greater than 85% is ideal for a tick to start and finish its life cycle. Studies have indicated that temperature and vapor play a significant role in determining the range for tick population. More specifically, maximum temperature has been found to play the most influential variable in sustaining tick populations. Higher temperatures augment both hatching and developmental rates while hindering overall survival. Temperature is so important to overall survival that an average monthly minimum temperature of below -7 °C in the winter can prevent an area from maintaining established populations.

The effect of climate on the tick life cycle is one of the more difficult projections to make in relation to climate and vector-borne disease. Unlike other vectors, tick life cycles span multiple seasons as they mature from larva to nymph to adult. Further, infection and spread of diseases such as Lyme disease happens across the multiple stages and different classes of vertebrate hosts, adding additional variables to consider. Although it is a European species from the Lyme borreliosis spirochetes, Borrelia garinii was documented from infected ticks on seabirds in North America. Further research is needed to improve evolutionary models predicting distributional changes in this tick-borne system in the face of climate change. Infection of ticks happen in the larval/nymph stage (after the first blood meal) when they are exposed to Borrelia burgdorferi (the spirochete responsible for Lyme disease), but transmission to humans doesn't occur until the adult stages.

The expansion of tick populations is concurrent with global climatic change. Species distribution models of recent years indicate that the deer tick, known as I. scapularis, is pushing its distribution to higher latitudes of the Northeastern United States and Canada, as well as pushing and maintaining populations in the South Central and Northern Midwest regions of the United States. Climate models project further expansion of tick habit north into Canada as progressing Northwest from the Northeastern United States. Additionally, however, tick populations are expected to retreat from the Southeastern coast of the U.S., but this has not yet been observed. It's estimated that coinciding with this expansion, increased average temperatures may double tick populations by 2020 as well as bring an earlier start to the tick exposure season.

Tick populations are not only spreading wider but moving to higher elevations. In Colorado, the Rocky Mountain wood tick known as D. andersoni is found along the front range and is wont to feed on, and consequently infect, human populations with tularemia (Francisella tularensis), Rocky Mountain spotted fever (Rickettsia rickettsii), and Colorado tick fever (CTF virus). A case study testing climatic interaction affecting tick vector (D. andersoni) populations in Larimer County, Colorado indicated that an estimated increase of 1.2–2.0 °C in summer temperatures would increase tick populations moving 100m upwards in elevation, increasing the range and susceptibility of tick-borne illnesses along the front range.

With regard to the effects of a warming world and the expansion of tick populations to previously unexposed areas, adaptive keys to prevention will include expansion of health care infrastructure and pharmacologic availability, as well as education of people and providers as to the risks of disease and preventive measures they can take.

In the face of these expanding threats, strong collaboration between government officials and environmental scientists is necessary for advancing preventive and reactive response measures. Without acknowledging the climate changes that make environments more habitable for disease carriers, policy and infrastructure will lag behind vector borne disease spread. The human cost associated with denying climate change science is one that concerns many governments. In the United States, the Centers for Disease Control and Prevention (CDC) is conducting a grant program called Building Resilience Against Climate Effects (BRACE) which details a 5 step process for combating climate effects like tick borne disease spread. As is the case when responding to other vectors and effects of climate change, vulnerable populations including children and the elderly will need to be prioritized by any intervention. Productive policies in the U.S. and the world need to accurately model changes in vector populations as well as the burden of disease, educate the public on ways to mitigate infection, and prepare health systems for the increasing disease load.

Leishmaniasis 
Leishmaniasis is a neglected tropical disease, caused by parasites of the genus Leishmania and transmitted by sandflies; it is distributed mostly in tropical and subtropical regions around the world, wherever the sand fly vector and reservoir hosts are present. The disease can manifest in several ways depending on the infecting species of parasite: in cutaneous leishmaniasis, ulcers develop on the skin leaving stigmatizing scars, while in visceral leishmaniasis parasites invade internal organs and can be fatal if untreated. The WHO estimates 12 million people around the world are living with leishmaniasis, and the risk factors for this disease include poverty, urbanization, deforestation, and climate change.

As in other vector-borne diseases, one of the reasons climate changes can affect the incidence of leishmaniasis is the susceptibility of the sandfly vectors to changes in temperature, rainfall and humidity; these conditions will alter their range of distribution and seasonality. For example, modelling studies have predicted that climate change will increase suitable conditions for Phlebotomus vector species in Central Europe. Another model that looked at the distribution of Lutzomyia longipalpis, an important visceral leishmaniasis vector, suggested an increased range of this species in the Amazon Basin. A different study model that factored data on climate, policy and socio-economic changes of land use, found that the effects were different for cutaneous and visceral leishmaniasis, emphasizing the importance of considering each disease and region separately.

Parasite development inside the sandfly can also be affected by temperature changes. For instance, Leishmania peruviana infections were lost during sandfly defecation when the infected vector was kept at higher temperatures, whereas in the same experiment Leishmania infantum and Leishmania braziliensis temperature seemed to make no difference.

Ebola 
Ebola is one of the deadliest viruses, starting out as a small outbreak and eventually turning into a major global issue. The first time the virus was noticed was in 1976 near the Ebola River in Democratic Republic of Congo. The virus has been infecting people from time to time, leading to outbreaks in several African countries. The average case fatality rate of the Ebola virus is approximately 40% and there have been more than 28,600 cases with 11,310 deaths. Recent studies are holding climate change liable for the uptick in Ebola. Many researchers are linking deforestation to the disease, observing that change in the landscape increases wildlife contact with humans. Ebola virus is typically found in animals of the wild and can be transmitted from these animals to humans when exposed to infected bodily fluids. The virus can also be transmitted from another human when in direct contact with the virus hosts blood, vomit, or feces. Seasonal droughts alongside strong winds, thunderstorms, heat waves, floods, landslides, and a change in rainfall patterns also impact wildlife migration. These conditions pull them away from their natural environment and closer to human proximity. One example of an Ebola outbreak caused by climate change or a shift in nature was seen during the drought of Central Africa. This ultimately amplified food insecurity leading West African communities to eat animals such as bats who were infected with the virus.

Zika virus 
Zika virus, a vector-borne virus was first observed in 1947 and historically presented in cluster outbreaks in the tropical regions of Africa and Asia. Zika virus epidemics have affected larger populations including Micronesia and South Pacific Islands in 2007, and the Americas in 2013. Brazil has experienced one of the largest outbreaks of Zika virus with approximately 1.5 million cases reported in 2015. Pregnant women infected with Zika virus are at a higher risk of giving birth to children with congenital malformations, including microcephaly. In the context of climate change and temperature rise, it is predicted that Zika virus will affect more than 1.3 billion people by 2050. This is largely due to the expansion of environments conducive to vector growth and life cycles, such as those with temperatures ranging from 23.9 °C to 34 °C. Mosquito behaviors are also affected by the change in temperature including increased breeding and biting rates. Furthermore, extreme climate patterns, including drought, floods and heatwaves are known to exacerbate the proliferation of mosquito breeding ground and as a result, escalate the rate of virus-borne diseases. In addition to Zika virus transmission, mosquito-borne diseases such as yellow fever and dengue fever are also predicted to be more prevalent due to climate change.

COVID-19 
The United Nations Environment Programme classifies the COVID-19 as zoonotic, meaning the virus jumped from animals to humans. The emergence of zoonotic diseases has been increasing, in part due to climate change and anthropogenic habitat destruction. Factors contributing to the increased emergence include fluctuations in temperature and humidity, livestock farming, wildlife trade, habitat loss, and environmental degradation. The United Nations Environment Programme states that: "The most fundamental way to protect ourselves from zoonotic diseases is to prevent destruction of nature. Where ecosystems are healthy and bio-diverse, they are resilient, adaptable and help to regulate diseases."

The head of the World Health Organization, Tedros Adhanom Ghebreyesus, in a special video message spoke about the link between the health of the biosphere and prevention of pandemics like the COVID-19 pandemic and highlighted that efforts for improving health will not work without stopping climate change. The World Health Organization created a special page dedicated to frequently asked questions about coronavirus and climate change, including the link between climate change and the emergence of new zoonotic diseases.  it summarized the current knowledge about the issue as follows:

Other studies 

Part of the causes of the COVID-19 pandemic can be environmental, like climate change and deforestation. According to the World Bank climate change can increase the risk of an epidemic like the COVID-19 pandemic by a number of ways including by causing deforestation. Deforestation is responsible for 31% of zoonotic diseases.

Climate change can increase migration of animals and connection between them and humans. This can facilitate the transmission of viruses from one animal to another and to humans. Viruses generally learn to coexist with their host and become more dangerous when they pass to another. The increase in humidity can also make the transmission easier, even though increase in humidity and temperature may decrease the expansion of the pandemic.

A 2021 study found possible links between climate change and transmission of COVID-19 by bats. The authors found that climate-driven changes in the distribution and richness of bat species harboring coronaviruses may have occurred leading to a concentration of such species in eastern Asian hotspots (southern China, Myanmar, and Laos). Above mentioned conditions favor transmission of viruses. In this area live Sunda pangolins that are sold among other in the Wuhan wet market and are suspected of being the intermediate host in the transmission of SARS-CoV-2 who causes the pandemic. In the same area live also masked palm civets who probably played a similar role in the transmission of SARS-CoV-1 who also caused severe disease. The authors suggest, therefore, that climate change possibly contributed to some extent to the emergence of the pandemic.

The YOUNGO Health Working Group (part of the UNFCCC) emphasized the need to incorporate youth activists in post COVID – 19 green recovery referring among other to the link between climate change and COVID – 19 emergence.

Climate change reduces the number of animals in populations, leading to less genetic diversity. Such conditions facilitate the spread of viruses. Scientists have already linked a number of zoonotic diseases outbreaks to floods and droughts and their frequency will increase with climate change. Also, others impact of climate change can make societies less stable affecting the threat of wars, human migration and less effective medical and sanitation systems increase the risk of epidemics.

Increased temperatures can reduce the capability of the human body to fight the virus, while bats will be less impacted.

Climate change can cause food insecurity and lead to people eat bushmeat, for example bats, that are possibly linked to the outbreak.

Due to environmental and social causes, outbreaks became more frequent so the World Health Organization declared global health emergency 4 times. Through the 21st century, the number of pandemics like COVID-19 pandemic can increase due to several factors including climate change.

The origins of the virus that caused the COVID-19 pandemic are not yet known exactly, but it originated possibly in bats. Bats are vulnerable to climate change due to several factors, therefore, increases in aridity make them move closer to human settlements what facilitates virus's transmission to humans.

Factors that increase the likelihood of epidemics and pandemics like the COVID-19 pandemic include pressures on ecosystems, climate change and economic development. More zoonotic diseases were found in higher income countries with larger land areas, more dense human populations, and greater forest coverage.

In January 2021, a study showed that climate change and COVID-19 affected public health. Although greenhouse gas emissions have lowered during the COVID-19 pandemic, it is essential to consider the resurgence of these emissions post-COVID-19 that are likely to happen globally. COVID-19 did not only make it hard for people, but climate change made it even harder for communities and third-world countries where more disasters occur. Due to greenhouse gas emissions, air quality issues, flooding, hurricanes, heavy stress, wildfires, heat stroke due to rising ambient temperatures, and increased vector-borne illnesses should be considered during the COVID-19 pandemic. This intersection has merged as the most threatening public health challenge ever.

In August 2022, a study showed how "climate hazards have intensified 58% of human infectious diseases, including COVID-19."

Others

Emergence of new infectious diseases 
A concern about the emergence of new diseases from the fungal kingdom. Mammals have endothermy and homeothermy, which allows them to maintain elevated body temperature through life; but it can be defeated if the fungi were to adapt to higher temperatures and survive in the body. Fungi that are pathogenic for insects can be experimentally adapted to replicate at mammalian temperatures through cycles of progressive warming. This demonstrates that fungi are able to adapt rapidly to higher temperatures. The emergence of Candida auris on three continents is proposed to be as a result of global warming and has raised the danger that increased warmth by itself will trigger adaptations on certain microbes to make them pathogenic for humans.

Climate change may lead to dramatic increases in prevalence of a variety of infectious diseases. Beginning in the mid-'70s, an "emergence, resurgence and redistribution of infectious diseases" has occured. Reasons for this are likely multi-causal, dependent on a variety of social, environmental and climatic factors, however, many argue that the "volatility of infectious disease may be one of the earliest biological expressions of climate instability". Though many infectious diseases are affected by changes in climate, vector-borne diseases, such as malaria, dengue fever and leishmaniasis, present the strongest causal relationship. One major reason that change in climate increases the prevalence of vector borne disease is that temperature and rainfall play a key role in the distribution, magnitude, and viral capacity of mosquitoes, who are primary vectors for many vectors borne diseases. Observation and research detect a shift of pests and pathogens in the distribution away from the equator and towards Earth's poles. A tool that has been used to predict this distribution trend is the Dynamic Mosquito Simulation Process (DyMSiM). DyMSiM uses epidemiological and entomological data and practices to model future mosquito distributions based upon climate conditions and mosquitos living in the area. This modeling technique helps identify the distribution of specific species of mosquito, some of which are more susceptible to viral infection than others.

Mosquito transmitted diseases 
Environmental changes such as deforestation could increase local temperatures in the highlands thus could enhance the vectorial capacity of the anopheles. Anopheles mosquitoes are responsible for the transmission of a number of diseases in the world, such as, malaria, lymphatic filariasis and viruses that can cause such ailments, like the O'nyong'nyong virus.

Environmental changes, climate variability, and climate change are such factors that could affect biology and disease ecology of Anopheles vectors and their disease transmission potential. Climate change is expected to lead to latitudinal and altitudinal temperature increases. Global warming projections indicate that surface air warming for a "high scenario" is 4 C, with a likely range of 2.4–6.4 C by 2100. A temperature increase of this size would alter the biology and the ecology of many mosquito vectors and the dynamics of the diseases they transmit such as malaria. Anopheles mosquitoes in highland areas are to experience a larger shift in their metabolic rate due to climate change. This climate change is due to the deforestation in the highland areas where these mosquitos' dwell. When the temperature rises, the larvae take a shorter time to mature and, consequently, a greater capacity to produce more offspring. In turn this could potentially lead to an increase in malaria transmission when infected humans are available.

See also 
 Disease ecology
 Effects of climate change on human health
 Central Epidemic Command Center
 Public health emergency of international concern
 Environmental health

References 

Effects of climate change
Infectious diseases
Disease ecology